First Lieutenant David L. Cockley (June 8, 1843 – December 26, 1901) was an American soldier who fought in the American Civil War. Cockley received the country's highest award for bravery during combat, the Medal of Honor, for his action during the Battle of Waynesboro in Georgia on 4 December 1864. He was honored with the award on 2 August 1897.

Biography
Cockley was born in Lexington, Ohio on 8 June 1843. He enlisted into the 10th Ohio Cavalry. He died on 26 December 1901 and his remains are interred at the Shelby-Oakland Cemetery in Shelby, Ohio.

Medal of Honor citation

See also

List of American Civil War Medal of Honor recipients: A–F

Notes

References

External links
 Ohio in the Civil War: 10th Ohio Cavalry by Larry Stevens
 Regimental flag of the 10th Ohio Cavalry

1843 births
1901 deaths
People of Ohio in the American Civil War
Union Army officers
United States Army Medal of Honor recipients
American Civil War recipients of the Medal of Honor
People from Lexington, Ohio